Tramps is a 1983 Austrian drama film directed by Peter Patzak. The film was selected as the Austrian entry for the Best Foreign Language Film at the 56th Academy Awards, but was not accepted as a nominee.

Cast
 Elliott Gould as Willie Zobel
 Heinz Moog as Josef Luft
 Andrea Jonasson as Willies Frau
 Danny Hirsch as Tommi Zobel (as Dany Hirsch)
 Klaramaria Skala as Josefs Frau (as Klara Maria Skala)
 Hanno Pöschl as Rainer
 András Gönczöl as Erwin
 Erni Mangold as Willies Bekanntschaft

See also
 List of submissions to the 56th Academy Awards for Best Foreign Language Film
 List of Austrian submissions for the Academy Award for Best Foreign Language Film

References

External links
 

1983 films
1983 drama films
Austrian drama films
1980s German-language films
Films directed by Peter Patzak